Ždinja Vas is a settlement in the hills north of Novo Mesto in southeastern Slovenia. The area is part of the traditional region of Lower Carniola and is now included in the Southeast Slovenia Statistical Region.

Name
Ždinja Vas was attested in historical sources as Sigilsdorff and Sitingisdorff in 1145, Sittichendorff in 1250, Sydingendorf in 1252, and Sidigendorff in 1321, among other spellings. Based on the medieval transcriptions, the name may be derived from *Židihnja vas 'Jewish village'.

Church
The local church, built on the southern outskirts of the village, is dedicated to Saint James and belongs to the Parish of Šentpeter, Otočec. It was a medieval building that was extensively restyled in the Baroque style in the mid-17th century.

References

External links
Ždinja Vas on Geopedia

Populated places in the City Municipality of Novo Mesto